Harapan Bangsa Institute of Technology (ITHB) is a private university in Bandung, West Java, Indonesia. It was established by 'Yayasan Petra Harapan Bangsa' on 17 May 2002. It has 11 undergraduate programmes.

References

External links
Official website

Universities in Bandung
Educational institutions established in 2002
Private universities and colleges in Indonesia
2002 establishments in Indonesia